Stanichno-Luhansk Reserve is a protected nature reserve of Ukraine that covers a portion of the left bank of the Donets River floodplain.

Topography
The site is set back from the Donets River itself, on the terrace supporting a strip of flood lakes about 50 meters above sea level.  In the 1990s the lakes in the middle of the reserve were frequently connected to the river by flooding.  The soils are chernozym (black soils) on 15–20 meters of alluvium and limestone rocks.

Climate and ecoregion
The growing season lasts 200–210 days. The average annual precipitation is 460 mm, but varies from 300-680.

Flora and fauna
The reserve is covered mostly with deciduous forest (70%), meadow-steppe, and floodplain lakes.  The lower sandy regions near the river feature willow and poplar; on the terrace are oak forests.

Public use
As a strict nature reserve, Stanichno-Luhansk's primary purpose is protection of nature and scientific study.  Public access is limited: mass recreation and construction of facilities is prohibited as are hunting and fishing.

See also
 Lists of Nature Preserves of Ukraine (class Ia protected areas)
 National Parks of Ukraine (class II protected areas)

References

External links
 Map of Stanichno-Luhansk Reserve on OpenStreetMap.org
 Map of the Stanichno-Luhansk Reserve (PDF)

Nature reserves in Ukraine